Naby Diarso (born 1 January 1977 in Conakry) is a Guinean footballer, who currently plays with Satellite FC.

International career
He represented Guinea at the 2006 Africa Cup of Nations and 2008 games.

References

1977 births
Living people
Guinean footballers
Guinea international footballers
2006 Africa Cup of Nations players
2008 Africa Cup of Nations players
Satellite FC players
Association football goalkeepers